Kimberley Katherine Smith (born March 3, 1983) is a former American fashion model and actress.

Early life and education
Smith was born in Houston. A graduate of Permian High School in Odessa, Texas, she got her big break into modeling when she accompanied a friend to a Model Search of America contest. She was changed from a spectator to a competitor by the head of the contest, and soon after signed with Clipse Management of Dallas. Her face and figure have been featured for Victoria's Secret, Mac and Jac, Abercrombie & Fitch, Harper's Bazaar, and Andrew Marc. She also took part in two of Paul Marciano's Guess campaigns in 2000.

Career
Smith has appeared in several music videos, including NSYNC's "Bye Bye Bye" and "It's Gonna Be Me", Aerosmith's "Girls of Summer" and Maroon 5's "Wake Up Call". She entered the film business in 2002 with a cameo in Van Wilder as comely coed Casey, and followed with a small role in 2004's Catwoman as model Drina.

Smith appeared in the July 2005 issue of Maxim magazine, which was dedicated to American troops serving overseas. Kim posed with American military regalia including dog tags and a camouflage hat; the article and pictures are featured in the Girls of Maxim Gallery. The publication named her #91 in its 2006 list.

In 2007, Smith played a recurring role in the television series Friday Night Lights, based on the book of the same name, about the real-life Permian High School Panthers football team. Permian High School is Smith's Alma Mater.

Filmography

Film

Television

Music videos

References

External links
 

1983 births
Actresses from Texas
American female models
American film actresses
Living people
People from Odessa, Texas
21st-century American women